James Jonathan Chapman (born 2 November 1979) is an Australian former national, Olympic representative and Olympic medal winning rower.

Education
Raised in Sydney, Chapman attended Newington College where he was coached by Michael Morgan , an Olympian and fellow Old Newingtonian, and Robert Buntine, deputy headmaster. In 1997 he was a member of the Newington Head of the River winning 1st VIII that won the centenary regatta. He studied accounting at the University of Technology Sydney.

Club and state rowing 
His senior rowing was initially with the UTS Haberfield Rowing Club. For twelve of the thirteen years from 2003 to 2015 he was seated in the New South Wales state VIII which contested the King's Cup at the Australian Rowing Championships. In 2004, 2008, 2010, 2011, 2012, 2013, and 2014 Chapman rowed in victorious New South Wales King's Cup crews.

Following the 2008 Beijing Olympics Chapman joined the Sydney Rowing Club as a competing member and a senior coach.

National representative rowing 
Chapman was first selected to compete for Australia in the two seat of the men's VIII who took the silver medal at the under 23 World Championships in Copenhagen in 2000. In 2003 he rowed at the World Championships in the men's coxless four who placed 4th in the final. He was in the bow seat of the Australian Men's VIII at the World Championships 2006 who also finished 4th. He won a silver medal at the 2011 World Rowing Championships in the men's coxed pair with William Lockwood and David Webster.

Chapman first made Olympic selection as a reserve in the Australian squad for the 2004 Summer Olympics in Athens. He rowed for Australia in the men's VIII at the 2008 Summer Olympics in Beijing. At the 2012 London Olympics, Chapman won a silver medal in the Australian men's coxless four.

Banking
From 1998, Chapman worked at Westpac starting as a teller, completing his accounting degree. Employed as an associate director in the bank's institutional group, Chapman left Westpac in 2015 to commence his MBA at the Macquarie Graduate School of Management.

References

External links
 
 
 
 

1979 births
Living people
Olympic medalists in rowing
Rowers at the 2008 Summer Olympics
Rowers at the 2012 Summer Olympics
People educated at Newington College
Olympic silver medalists for Australia
Australian male rowers
Medalists at the 2012 Summer Olympics
World Rowing Championships medalists for Australia
21st-century Australian people